Gertrude Degenhardt (born 1 October 1940) is a German artist, especially a lithographer and illustrator, based in Mainz. She is known for illustrating the texts and albums of Franz Josef Degenhardt and of other political writers and singers including François Villon, Liam O'Flaherty, Bertolt Brecht, and Wolf Biermann. In the 1990s, she turned to topics around women, portraying them in art books such Women in Music, Vagabondage in Blue, and Vagabondage en Rouge.

Early life, education, and family 
She was born in New York City to German parents and grew up in Berlin from age two. Her childhood was marked by the Nazi regime, bombings, and the difficult time after World War II. Her family moved to Mainz in 1956, where she finished her schooling. She studied at the Staatliche Werkkunstschule für Gebrauchsgrafik, a school for applied graphics, until 1959, and then worked for advertising agencies in Frankfurt and Düsseldorf.

She met Franz Josef Degenhardt, his brother Martin, and their circle of friends, including other singer-songwriters (Liedermacher) , Hannes Wader, and Hein and Oss Kröher. In 1964, she married Martin Degenhardt, who died in 2002. Their daughter Annette became a guitarist and composer.

Career
From the mid-1960s, she has worked as a freelance artist. She designed covers for Franz Josef Degenhardt's albums, including Spiel nicht mit den Schmuddelkindern. Illustrations to François Villon's Das Große Testament received the "Schönstes Buch" (most beautiful book) award from the Stiftung Buchkunst in 1970.

Artistic style

In her works, Degenhardt appears as a keen observer of persons and their characteristics, rendered with a sense of absurdity and grotesque. Among her topics are enjoyment of life, hate, desire, admiration, bliss, disdain, greed, and suffering. Music and wine are frequent features of her work, also the Gonsbach valley, revolution (Republic of Mainz), vagabonds, dance, musicians, tramps, Ireland (Farewell to Connaught), and, again and again, her husband Martin Degenhardt. She portrayed John Lennon in an etching Give Peace a Chance. Some sequences, such as Fiddle & Pint, were first exhibited in Dublin.

In the 1990s, she turned to women's topics such as Vagabondage, cycles of wild and unique women, in books such as Women in Music, Vagabondage in Blue, and Vagabondage en Rouge, with women making music in protest of political failures and social injustice. Vagabondage Ad Mortem is a danse macabre of 1995. Degenhardt illustrated many texts and books, such as Liam O'Flaherty's Der Stromer, and works by Brecht, Biermann, her brother-in-law Franz Josef Degenhardt, and other political authors, including covers of records of Irish Folk and singer-songwriters.

Awards 
 1968 Graphik-Biennale-Preis in Kraków, Poland
 1976 Graphik-Biennale-Preis in Fredrikstad, Norway
 1978 Silver Medal of the world exhibition of Buchkunst (book art) in Tel Aviv for the songbook Das sind unsre Lieder, published by  Hein & Oss Kröher
 2001: Order of Merit of Rhineland-Palatinate
 2019: Hannes Gaab Prize of Mainz

Exhibitions 
Exhibitions included:
 1988: Museum der bildenden Künste, Leipzig
 1989: The Kenny Gallery, Galway
 1990: 
 1993: Vagabondage – Women in Music, Kulturspeicher of Stadtmuseum Oldenburg
 1993: 
 1994: Imagines – Women in Music, Galerie Kramer, Hamburg
 1995: Vagabondage ad Mortem, Andreas Paul Weber Museum, Ratzeburg
 1998: Villa Musica
 1999: Kulturspeicher, Oldenburg
 2002: 
 2002: The Kenny Gallery, Galway
 2004: 
 2006: Schloss Landestrost
 2007: Stadtmuseum Borken
 2007: Maison de Rhénanie-Palatinat, Dijon
 2011: Retrospective on the occasion of her 75th birthday in Kulturspeicher of Stadtmuseum Oldenburg

Degenhardt is listed as one of the 100 most influential women in Rhineland-Palatinate.

Publications 
 Das Fest kann beginnen. Maison de Rhénanie-Palatinat und Edition GD, Mainz 2006. 
 Tanzende Paare. Edition Villa Musica und Edition GD, Mainz 2004. 
 Vagabondage en rouge. Pinselzeichnungen, Lithographie, Radierungen. Edition GD, Mainz 2001. 
 Fiddle & Pint. Edition GD, Mainz 2000. 
 Quartette. Edition Villa Musica und Edition GD, Mainz 1998. 
 Vagabondage in blue. Frauen an Trommeln. Edition GD, Mainz 1996. 
 Vagabondage ad mortem. Musikanten des Todes. Edition GD, Mainz 1995. 
 Musikfrauen – Women in Music. Mittelrhein-Museum Koblenu und Edition GD, Mainz 1990. 
 Farewell to Connaught. 65 Kaltnadel-Radierungen von der irischen Westküste. Büchergilde Gutenberg, Frankfurt/M. 1989. 
 Von der anderen Musik. Zeichnungen und Radierungen 1970–1985. Kulturamt Böblingen 1985
 In praise of pints oder Maria zu Ehren. 40 Zeichnungen mit dem Gänsekiel. Edition GD, Mainz 1983, 
 So ein Tag, so wunderschön wie heute. Limpert, Frankfurt/M. 1974. 
 Nostalgia. Edition GD, Mainz-Gonsenheim 1971
 Loppe Loppe Leiter. Linkisch Lied für Lust und Lümmel. Eberwein, Offenbach 1967

References

Further reading 
 Willy Barth: Vorwort. In: Quartette. Mainz 1998, 
 Andreas Räsch: Die Welt der Gertrude Degenhardt. Ein Porträt. In: Muschelhaufen. Jahresschrift für Literatur und Grafik. Viersen 2007, No. 47/48, 
 Klaus Weschenfelder: Music In Women. In: Musikfrauen – Women in Music. Mainz 1990, 
 Stefanie Mittenzwei: Den Klängen verfallen. Gertrude Degenhardts neuer Bilderzyklus "Musikfrauen". In: Mainz. Vierteljahreshefte für Kultur, Politik, Wirtschaft, Geschichte. No. 1. 1991. Verlag H. Schmidt Mainz, pp. 78–89,

External links 
 
 
 Gertrude Degenhardt artnet.de

German lithographers
German illustrators
20th-century German printmakers
1940 births
Living people
Artists from New York City
20th-century lithographers